The 2008 European Cup Winter Throwing was held on 15 and 16 March 2008 at Stadion Park mladeži in Split, Croatia. It was the eighth edition of the athletics competition for throwing events.

The competition featured men's and women's contests in shot put, discus throw, javelin throw and hammer throw. In addition to the senior competitions, there were also under-23 events for younger athletes.

Medal summary

Senior men

Senior women

Under-23 men

Under-23 women

References

Results
Split  CRO  15 - 16 March. Tilastopaja. Retrieved on 2013-06-22.

European Throwing Cup
European Cup Winter Throwing
International athletics competitions hosted by Croatia
2008 in European sport
European Cup Winter Throwing
Sport in Split, Croatia